Nikola Marjanović (born 21 May 2001) is a Serbian football centre-back who plays for Proleter Novi Sad.

References

External links
 
 
 

2001 births
Living people
Association football defenders
Serbian footballers
FK Brodarac players
FK Proleter Novi Sad players
Serbian SuperLiga players
Serbia under-21 international footballers